Los Molinos (Spanish for "The Mills") is a census-designated place (CDP) in Tehama County, California, United States. The population was 2,037 at the 2010 census, up from 1,952 at the 2000 census.

History

Los Molinos ("the mills" in Spanish) traces its history back to a railroad station which opened at the site in 1905. A post office has been in operation at Los Molinos since 1905.

Geography
Los Molinos is located at  (40.024439, -122.099442).

Demographics

2010
The 2010 United States Census reported that Los Molinos had a population of 2,037. The racial makeup of Los Molinos was 1,581 (77.6%) White, 0 (0.0%) African American, 39 (1.9%) Native American, 7 (0.3%) Asian, 2 (0.1%) Pacific Islander, 321 (15.8%) from other races, and 87 (4.3%) from two or more races. Hispanic or Latino of any race were 537 persons (26.4%).

The Census reported that 2,004 people (98.4% of the population) lived in households, 32 (1.6%) lived in non-institutionalized group quarters, and 1 (0%) were institutionalized.

There were 786 households, out of which 242 (30.8%) had children under the age of 18 living in them, 366 (46.6%) were opposite-sex married couples living together, 88 (11.2%) had a female householder with no husband present, 43 (5.5%) had a male householder with no wife present.  There were 70 (8.9%) unmarried opposite-sex partnerships, and 1 (0.1%) same-sex married couples or partnerships. 232 households (29.5%) were made up of individuals, and 120 (15.3%) had someone living alone who was 65 years of age or older. The average household size was 2.55.  There were 497 families (63.2% of all households); the average family size was 3.18.

The population was spread out, with 483 people (23.7%) under the age of 18, 146 people (7.2%) aged 18 to 24, 473 people (23.2%) aged 25 to 44, 573 people (28.1%) aged 45 to 64, and 362 people (17.8%) who were 65 years of age or older.  The median age was 41.7 years. For every 100 females, there were 98.7 males.  For every 100 females age 18 and over, there were 99.2 males.

The homeowner vacancy rate was 3.7%; the rental vacancy rate was 17.6%.  1,225 people (60.1% of the population) lived in owner-occupied housing units and 779 people (38.2%) lived in rental housing units.

2000
As of the census of 2000, there were 1,952 people, 734 households, and 474 families residing in the CDP. The racial makeup of the CDP was 86.07% White, 0.31% African American, 1.69% Native American, 0.46% Asian, 0.05% Pacific Islander, 8.15% from other races, and 3.28% from two or more races. Hispanic or Latino of any race were 23.82% of the population.

There were 734 households, out of which 30.9% had children under the age of 18 living with them, 47.3% were married couples living together, 12.4% had a female householder with no husband present, and 35.3% were non-families. 31.2% of all households were made up of individuals, and 15.1% had someone living alone who was 65 years of age or older.  The average household size was 2.61 and the average family size was 3.28.

In the CDP, the population was spread out, with 28.8% under the age of 18, 8.1% from 18 to 24, 25.1% from 25 to 44, 21.1% from 45 to 64, and 16.9% who were 65 years of age or older.  The median age was 36 years. For every 100 females, there were 89.5 males.  For every 100 females age 18 and over, there were 87.4 males.

The median income for a household in the CDP was $26,691, and the median income for a family was $30,769. Males had a median income of $31,458 versus $20,769 for females. The per capita income for the CDP was $12,107.  About 18.0% of families and 18.9% of the population were below the poverty line, including 25.0% of those under age 18 and 9.4% of those age 65 or over.

Politics
In the state legislature Los Molinos is in the 4th Senate District, represented by Republican Jim Nielsen, and in the 3rd Assembly District, represented by Republican James Gallagher.

Notable people
 Marv Grissom, Major League Baseball pitcher
Leo Gorcey, Hollywood Actor, resident from 1956 to 1964, is buried at Molinos Cemetery.

References

Census-designated places in Tehama County, California
Census-designated places in California